Propebela diomedea is a species of sea snail, a marine gastropod mollusk in the family Mangeliidae.

Description
The length of the shell attains 9.9 mm, its diameter 5 mm.

Distribution
This marine species was found off Monterey Bay, California

References

  Bartsch, P, Some turrid mollusks of Monterey Bay and vicinity; Proceedings of the Biological Society of Washington, v. 57 p. 57–68

External links
 Smith & Gordon, Mollusks of Monterey Bay; Proceedings of the California Academy of Sciences, 4th series, vol. 26

diomedea
Gastropods described in 1944